Propebela turricula, common name the turreted conelet, is a species of sea snail, a marine gastropod mollusk in the family Mangeliidae.

Description
The length of the shell varies between 12 mm and 18 mm.

The narrow shell is turriculated with acute shoulders and with the ribs strongly projecting above it and then running across to the sutures. The ribs number about sixteen, nearly straight, prominent, crossed by very close, rather fine revolving striae. The aperture is rather narrow. The siphonal canal is narrow and produced.

Distribution
This marine species has an circumarctic distribution, down to Massachusetts, USA; from the Bering Sea to Washington , USA. Fossils have been found in Pliocene strata of the United Kingdom and in Quaternary of Canada and the United Kingdom.

References

 Donovan E. (1801–1804). The natural history of British shells, including figures and descriptions of all the species hitherto discovered in Great Britain, systematically arranged in the Linnean manner,with scientific and general observations on each. printed for the author, and F. & C: Rivington, London : vol. 1 [1800], pl. 1-36; vol. 2 [1801], pl. 37-72; vol. 3 [1801], pl. 73-108; vol. 4 [1803], pl. 109-144; vol. 5 [1804], pl. 145–180, all with unpaginated text and indexes page(s): vol. 5 pl. 156
 Abbott R. T. (1974). American seashells. The marine Mollusca of the Atlantic and Pacific coast of North America. ed. 2. Van Nostrand, New York. 663 pp., 24 pls
 Bogdanov, I. P. Mollusks of Oenopotinae subfamily (Gastropoda, Pectinibranchia, Turridae) in the seas of the USSR. Nauka, 1990.
 Turgeon, D.; Quinn, J.F.; Bogan, A.E.; Coan, E.V.; Hochberg, F.G.; Lyons, W.G.; Mikkelsen, P.M.; Neves, R.J.; Roper, C.F.E.; Rosenberg, G.; Roth, B.; Scheltema, A.; Thompson, F.G.; Vecchione, M.; Williams, J.D. (1998). Common and scientific names of aquatic invertebrates from the United States and Canada: mollusks. 2nd ed. American Fisheries Society Special Publication, 26. American Fisheries Society: Bethesda, MD (USA). . IX, 526 + cd-rom pp.
 Howson, C. M.; Picton, B. E. (1997). The species directory of the marine fauna and flora of the British Isles and surrounding seas. Ulster Museum Publication, 276. The Ulster Museum: Belfast, UK. . vi, 508 (+ cd-rom)
 Vestergaard, K. V. (1935). Über den Laich und die Larven von Scalaria communis (Lam.), Nassarius pygmaeus (Lam.) und Bela turricola (Mont.). Zoologischer Anzeiger, 109, 217–222
 Gofas, S.; Le Renard, J.; Bouchet, P. (2001). Mollusca. in: Costello, M.J. et al. (eds), European Register of Marine Species: a check-list of the marine species in Europe and a bibliography of guides to their identification. Patrimoines Naturels. 50: 180–213. 
 Linkletter, L. E. (1977). A checklist of marine fauna and flora of the Bay of Fundy. Huntsman Marine Laboratory, St. Andrews, N.B. 68
 Muller, Y. (2004). Faune et flore du littoral du Nord, du Pas-de-Calais et de la Belgique: inventaire. [Coastal fauna and flora of the Nord, Pas-de-Calais and Belgium: inventory]. Commission Régionale de Biologie Région Nord Pas-de-Calais: France. 307 pp., 
 Vaught, K.C.; Tucker Abbott, R.; Boss, K.J. (1989). A classification of the living Mollusca. American Malacologists: Melbourne. . XII, 195 pp. 
 de Kluijver, M. J.; Ingalsuo, S. S.; de Bruyne, R. H. (2000). Macrobenthos of the North Sea [CD-ROM]: 1. Keys to Mollusca and Brachiopoda. World Biodiversity Database CD-ROM Series. Expert Center for Taxonomic Identification (ETI): Amsterdam, The Netherlands. . 1 cd-rom.

External links
 Nekhaev, Ivan O. "Marine shell-bearing Gastropoda of Murman (Barents Sea): an annotated check-list." Ruthenica 24.2 (2014): 75
 
 
  Montagu, George. (1803). Testacea Britannica or Natural History of British Shells, Marine, Land, and Fresh-Water, Including the Most Minute: Systematically Arranged and Embellished with Figures. J. White, London, Vol. 1, xxxvii + 291 pp. and Vol. 2, 293–606
 Locard A. (1891). Les coquilles marines des côtes de France. Annales de la Société Linnéenne de Lyon. 37: 1–385
 Norman A.M. (1899). Revision of British Mollusca. Annals and Magazine of Natural History. (7) 4: 126–153.
 Trott, T. J. (2004). Cobscook Bay inventory: a historical checklist of marine invertebrates spanning 162 years. Northeastern Naturalist. 11, 261–324

turricula
Gastropods described in 1803